The 2018 Barnet Borough Council election took place on 3 May 2018 to elect members of Barnet Borough Council in England. It took place on the same day as other local elections in 2018. In the last election, the Conservatives won control of the council with 32 seats, compared to 30 for Labour and 1 for the Liberal Democrats. On 15 March 2018, following the resignation of a Conservative councillor, the council was in a state of no overall control. The election on 3 May 2018 saw the Conservatives take back overall control with a majority of 13.

On 20 September 2019 Gabriel Rozenberg (elected Conservative) joined the Liberal Democrats, citing his opposition to Brexit. On 2 October, he was then followed by Jess Brayne (elected Labour) who also defected to the Liberal Democrats.

Background 
At the last election in 2014, the Conservatives were re-elected with a reduced majority. Labour gained 9 seats from the Conservatives, but the Conservatives remained in office as a result of winning 2 seats from the Liberal Democrats in Childs Hill ward.

The Conservatives remained in control of the council with 32 seats until March 2018, when councillor Sury Khatri resigned his membership and role as party whip after being deselected as a Conservative candidate. As a result, the Conservatives lost their majority on the Council, leaving them as a minority administration.

Election results 
Incumbent councillors are marked with an asterisk *.

|}

Council composition

Prior to the election, the composition of the council was:

After the election, the composition of the council was:

Results

Brunswick Park

Burnt Oak

Childs Hill

Colindale

Coppetts

East Barnet

Pearce was a councillor for Cockfosters ward in the London Borough of Enfield prior to the election.

East Finchley

Farrier was a councillor for Burnt Oak ward prior to the election.

Edgware

Finchley Church End

Garden Suburb
On September 20, 2019, Cllr Gabriel Rozenberg left the Conservatives  to join the Liberal Democrats due to their stance on Brexit and the election of Boris Johnson as party leader.

Golders Green

Hale

Hendon

Ioannidis was a councillor for Brunswick Park ward prior to the election.

High Barnet

Trevethan was a councillor for Underhill prior to the election.

Mill Hill

Oakleigh

Totteridge

Underhill
On February 25, 2019, Cllr Jessica Brayne left the Labour Party over their failure to tackle anti-Semitism and their stance on Brexit. She then joined the Liberal Democrats in September 2019.

West Finchley

West Hendon

Woodhouse

By-elections between 2018 and 2022

East Barnet

Edgware

References

2018 London Borough council elections
2018